The Bailing Cup is a Go competition.

Outline
The Bailing Cup is an international Go open tournament sponsored and hosted by the Bailing Group of China. It is held every other year.

Seeded players and Preliminaries
16 seeded players are invited and 48 players will qualify from preliminaries. Seeded players are chosen as follows:

2 top players of last tournament
5 from 
3 from 
3 from 
1 from 
2 from wild cards (issued from the host)

The winner's purse is ￥1,800,000.

From the 4th Bailing Cup, it became a tournament and only 16 players invited are competing. Players are chosen as follows:

2 top players of last tournament
6 from 
3 from 
3 from 
1 from 
1 from a wild card (issued from the host)

The winner's purse is ￥1,000,000.

Winners and Runners-up

By nation

References

Go competitions in China